

See also 2015 in birding and ornithology, main events of 2016 and 2017 in birding and ornithology
The year 2016 in birding and ornithology.

Worldwide

New species
See also Bird species new to science described in the 2000s

Himalayan forest thrush (Zoothera salimalii):

Taxonomic developments

Ornithologists

Deaths

World listing

Europe

Britain

Breeding birds
 Reintroduction of the white stork (Ciconia ciconia) began with the aim of a population of at least fifty breeding birds in southern England by 2030. Initially, rehabilitated wild birds from France and Poland will spend the first two years in enclosures.

Migrant and wintering birds

Rare birds
 A bearded vulture (Gypaetus barbatus) seen at various sites in Wales and southern England has been placed in Category E by the British Ornithologists' Union Records Committee (BOURC), which lists species as introductions, human-assisted transportees, escapees from captivity, or if breeding populations are not considered self-sustaining.

Other Events

Ireland

North America
To be completed

See also
 White stork project

References

2016
Bird
Birding and ornithology by year